Alhassane "Lass" Bangoura (born 30 March 1992) is a Guinean professional footballer who plays as a right winger for Super League Greece 2 club Chania FC.

Club career

Rayo Vallecano
Born in Conakry, Bangoura began his career with local Étoile de Guinée. In 2010, aged 18, he joined the youth ranks of Spanish club Rayo Vallecano, scoring 23 goals in 25 games in his last year as a junior.

Bangoura appeared in four Segunda División matches with the first team in the 2010–11 season, as the Madrid side returned to La Liga after an eight-year absence. In June 2011 he attracted the interest of neighbours Real Madrid, who made an offer to purchase him.

Bangoura made his debut in Spain's top division on 28 August 2011, playing 31 minutes in a 1–1 away draw against Athletic Bilbao. On 23 October he scored in a 2–0 win at Real Betis, who had also been promoted the previous campaign. On 19 February 2012, he netted twice in a 5–3 away victory over Levante UD.

In the early days of the 2015 January transfer window, Bangoura was loaned to Granada CF until June. He scored on his debut, a 1–2 home loss to Sevilla FC in the round of 16 of the Copa del Rey.

On 31 January 2016, Bangoura was loaned to Ligue 1 club Stade de Reims until the end of the season. He scored in his fifth appearance, a 4–1 defeat of FC Girondins de Bordeaux, in an eventual relegation.

On 1 February 2018, Bangoura was loaned to Spanish second division team UD Almería for six months. He made his debut two days later, coming on as a 46th-minute substitute for Mandi away against Lorca FC, in a 2–1 comeback win.

On 23 January 2019, Bangoura joined Major League Soccer side Vancouver Whitecaps FC on a one-year loan deal. He played 18 total matches, and scored in a 3–2 loss at the Houston Dynamo on 16 March.

Still owned by Rayo, on 1 February 2020 Bangoura was loaned to CD Lugo until 30 June. He continued to be loaned the following seasons, to C.S. Emelec (Ecuadorian Serie A) and PAS Lamia 1964 (Super League Greece).

Later career
Bangoura remained in Greece in September 2022, signing for Chania FC of the Super League 2.

International career
Bangoura represented Guinea in the 2009 African U-17 Championship. He made his debut for the senior team in 2011 at 19, and was selected for the 2012 and 2019 Africa Cup of Nations.

Career statistics

Club

International

References

External links

1992 births
Living people
Sportspeople from Conakry
Guinean footballers
Association football wingers
La Liga players
Segunda División players
Rayo Vallecano players
Granada CF footballers
UD Almería players
CD Lugo players
Ligue 1 players
Stade de Reims players
Major League Soccer players
Vancouver Whitecaps FC players
Ecuadorian Serie A players
C.S. Emelec footballers
Super League Greece players
Super League Greece 2 players
PAS Lamia 1964 players
Guinea youth international footballers
Guinea international footballers
2012 Africa Cup of Nations players
2019 Africa Cup of Nations players
Guinean expatriate footballers
Expatriate footballers in Spain
Expatriate footballers in France
Expatriate soccer players in Canada
Expatriate footballers in Ecuador
Expatriate footballers in Greece
Guinean expatriate sportspeople in Spain
Guinean expatriate sportspeople in France
Guinean expatriate sportspeople in Canada
Guinean expatriate sportspeople in Ecuador
Guinean expatriate sportspeople in Greece